

The Indian American Muslim Council (IAMC) (formerly Indian Muslim Council-USA) is an advocacy organization of Indian American Muslims, with multiple chapters across the United States. The group focuses on advocacy to promote pluralism and religious freedom in India. It also focuses on interfaith understanding and advocating on behalf of the Indian Muslim diaspora in the United States.

IAMC was established on August 15, 2002, in response to the 2002 Gujarat riots. As a member of the Coalition Against Genocide, IAMC has campaigned in collaboration with other organisations in the coalition. For example, such advocacy led to Narendra Modi's visa ban in the United States in 2005. IAMC is no longer a member of the Coalition.

IAMC is also a member of the Alliance Against Genocide, an international coalition dedicated to the prevention of genocide.

See also
 Human Rights Watch
 Sikh Coalition
 United Sikhs
 World Sikh Organization
 Khalsa Aid
 Hindu American Foundation
 Federation of Tamil Sangams of North America
 Friends of South Asia (FOSA) is a California, United States based social and political activist organization
 United States India Political Action Committee (USINPAC)
 Coalition Against Genocide
 The Council on American-Islamic Relations (CAIR)

References

Bibliography

External links
 Official website
 Indian American Muslim Council (a profile) Bloomberg.com website, Retrieved 10 January 2022.
 PTI, Members of global Indian diaspora demand arrest of those responsible for 'genocidal hate speech' at Haridwar conclave, The Hindu, 9 January 2022.
 Indian American Muslim Council Condemns Dadri Mob Killing NDTV, 5 October 2015.

2002 establishments in the United States
India–United States relations
Islamic organizations based in the United States
Islamic organizations established in 2002